The 2000 Middle Tennessee Blue Raiders football team represented Middle Tennessee State University in the 2000 NCAA Division I-A football season.

Schedule

References

Middle Tennessee
Middle Tennessee Blue Raiders football seasons
Middle Tennessee Blue Raiders football